Sabnam Rai (born 23 August 199o, Jhapa, Nepal) is a Nepalese cricketer who plays for Nepal women's national cricket team.

In October 2021, She was named in Nepal's side for the 2021 ICC Women's T20 World Cup Asia Qualifier tournament in the United Arab Emirates. She made her T20I debut against Qatar in the Nepal women's tour of Qatar on 17 November 2021.

References

External links 
 

1999 births
Living people
Nepalese women cricketers
Nepal women Twenty20 International cricketers
People from Jhapa District